The enzyme propioin synthase catalyzes the chemical reaction

4-hydroxy-3-hexanone  2 propanal

This enzyme belongs to the family of lyases, specifically the aldehyde-lyases, which cleave carbon-carbon bonds.  The systematic name of this enzyme class is 4-hydroxy-3-hexanone propanal-lyase (propanal-forming). Other names in common use include 4-hydroxy-3-hexanone aldolase, and 4-hydroxy-3-hexanone propanal-lyase.

References

 

EC 4.1.2
Enzymes of unknown structure